Sindhudurg Airport , also known as Chipi Airport, is a domestic airport serving the city of Sindhudurg, Maharastra, India. Construction was completed by the second half of 2018 and a test flight from Mumbai landed on 12 September 2018 on the occasion of Ganesh Chaturthi. The airport was formally inaugurated on 5 March 2019. Currently, Alliance Air is the only airline operating flights from Mumbai. Commercial flights started at the airport from 9 October 2021.

History
IRB Infrastructure won the bid to develop the airport in 2009 for a concession period of 95 years. The project received environmental clearance in March 2012. Work on the airport was completed in the second half of 2013,
and was expected to be completed by August 2014, but had been delayed for years because of issues in acquiring private land, among others.

After overcoming a series of delays, the airport was finally ready and launched civilian operations on 9 October 2021.

Alliance Air started its operations with flights from Mumbai on 9 October 2021. Other airlines have also started planning seasonal flights to the airport from Delhi, Pune, Nagpur, and Hyderabad.

Structure
The airport was built by IRB Sindhudurg Airport Pvt. Ltd. on a build–operate–transfer (BOT) basis for the Maharashtra Industrial Development Corporation (MIDC). The airport was initially planned with a 3170 metre long runway at a cost of Rs. 175 crores. It is spread over 275 hectares and the 2500 metre runway can accommodate aircraft like the Airbus A320 and Boeing 737. The airport terminal building can handle 200 departing and 200 arriving passengers during peak hours.

Airlines and destinations

Incidents
On 21 November 2021, 25 to 30 golden jackals were found straying on the runway. They were also found inside the airport's perimeter causing a delay of over 20 minutes of the landing of a flight from Mumbai.

See also

 Ratnagiri Airport
 Kolhapur Airport
 Goa Airport
 Pune Airport

References

Airports in Maharashtra
Sindhudurg district
Environmental controversies